Ecclitica torogramma, also known as the ponga ugly nestmaker, is a species of moth of the family Tortricidae. It is endemic to New Zealand.

Taxonomy
This species was first described by Edward Meyrick in 1897 using specimens collected by George Hudson in Wellington and named Cacoecia torogramma.

Description

The larva is small and green with a brown head and when mature is under 10 mm in length.

Meyrick described the adult female of this species as follows:

Distribution
This species is endemic to New Zealand and is found throughout the North Island and in the northern parts of the South Island.

Habitat and hosts 
This species inhabits native forest. Its larval host plant is the silver fern.

Behaviour
The larvae create a nest for themselves by weaving the growing tips of the fronds of its host plant together with silk webbing. They consume these fronds during spring and summer. Adults of this species are on the wing from September to February. Adults are nocturnal although they can sometimes be seen flying during the day when disturbed. They are attracted to light. The adult moths can often be located during the day, hiding on the underside of fronds of their host plant.

References

Moths described in 1897
Archipini
Moths of New Zealand
Endemic fauna of New Zealand
Taxa named by Edward Meyrick
Endemic moths of New Zealand